The 2014 Dartmouth Big Green football team represented Dartmouth College in the 2014 NCAA Division I FCS football season. The Big Green were led by head coach Buddy Teevens in his tenth straight year and 15th overall and played their home games at Memorial Field. They were a member of the Ivy League. They finished the season 8–2 overall and 6–1 in Ivy League play to place second. Dartmouth averaged 5,549 fans per game.

Schedule

References

Dartmouth
Dartmouth Big Green football seasons
Dartmouth Big Green football